SJ Sindu (born November 27, 1987) is a genderqueer Sri Lankan American novelist and short story writer. Her first novel, Marriage of a Thousand Lies, was released by Soho Press in June 2017, won the Publishing Triangle Edmund White Award for Debut Fiction, and was named an American Library Association Stonewall Honor Book. Her second novel, Blue-Skinned Gods, was released on November 17, 2021, also by Soho Press. Her second chapbook Dominant Genes, which won the 2020 Black River Chapbook Competition, is being released in February 2022 by Black Lawrence Press. Her middle-grade fantasy graphic novel, Shakti, is forthcoming from HarperCollins. Her work has been published in Brevity, The Normal School, The Los Angeles Review of Books, apt, Vinyl Poetry, PRISM International, VIDA, Black Girl Dangerous, rkvry quarterly, and elsewhere. Sindu was a 2013 Lambda Literary Fellow, holds an MA from the University of Nebraska-Lincoln, and a PhD in Creative Writing from Florida State University.  She currently teaches Creative Writing at University of Toronto Scarborough.

Bibliography

Novels 
 Marriage of a Thousand Lies. New York: Soho Press, 2017, 
Blue-Skinned Gods. New York: Soho Press, Nov 02, 2021, ISBN 9781641292429

Chapbooks 
 I Once Met You But You Were Dead. Philadelphia: Split Lip Press, 2017
Dominant Genes. New York: Black Lawrence Press, 2022

Awards
Publishing Triangle Edmund White Award for Debut Fiction for Marriage of a Thousand Lies
American Library Association Stonewall Honor Book for Marriage of a Thousand Lies
Lambda Literary Award Finalist for Marriage of a Thousand Lies
Independent Publisher Book Awards Silver Medal for Marriage of a Thousand Lies
Split Lip Turnbuckle Chapbook Contest award winner for I Once Met You But You Were Dead
Winner of the Fall 2020 Black River Chapbook Competition for Dominant Genes

References 

1987 births
Living people
Sri Lankan emigrants to the United States
American LGBT novelists
Tamil writers
Sri Lankan novelists
American people of Sri Lankan Tamil descent
Sri Lankan Tamil writers
Queer writers
American non-binary writers